KRDC may refer to:

 KRDC (AM), a radio station in Pasadena, California, United States
 KRDC (KDE), a remote desktop client